Jupiter Jones may refer to:

 Jupiter Jones, the lead investigator the Three Investigators series of children's books
 Jupiter Jones, the protagonist of the 2015 film Jupiter Ascending played by Mila Kunis
 , a German band